Eddie Brennan is a Gaelic footballer.

A former club footballer with St Eunan's in Letterkenny, with whom he has won numerous county championships, he previously played for Drumcliffe–Rosses Point, the Sligo county football team, and since moving to Donegal, the Donegal county football team. Brennan's transfer from Sligo to Donegal proved controversial, generating much media coverage and opposition from rival clubs. The dispute led to the final of the 2002 Donegal Senior Football Championship not being played until 2003.

He had stopped playing for his club by the time it won the 2014 Donegal Senior Football Championship.

He jointly managed the St Eunan's senior footballers with Barry Meehan in 2017.

He also managed St Naul's.

Downings appointed him as team trainer ahead of the 2020 season.

Honours
 Donegal Senior Football Championship: 2007, 2008, 2009, 2012

References

External links
 Eddie Brennan at gaainfo.com

Year of birth missing (living people)
Living people
Donegal inter-county Gaelic footballers
Drumcliffe–Rosses Point Gaelic footballers
Gaelic football managers
Sligo inter-county Gaelic footballers
St Eunan's Gaelic footballers